The 1982 New Zealand rugby league tour of Australia and Papua New Guinea was a four match tour by the New Zealand national rugby league team. The New Zealand national rugby league team lost a series 0-2 against Australia, but defeated Papua New Guinea in a one-off test match. Their only other game was a match against Queensland.

Background
New Zealand last toured Australia in 1978 while this would be their second trip to Papua New Guinea having played a test against the Kumuls in Port Moresby in 1978.

Squad
The New Zealand squad was chosen from those playing in the NZ, Australia and English competitions. The coach was Cecil Mountford with the captain being Hawera's giant back row forward Graeme West, although North Sydney's Mark Graham would captain the team in the tests against Australia.

The Kiwis were without the services of fiery Cronulla-Sutherland brothers Dane and Kurt Sorensen after the cash strapped Sharks refused to release them for test duty.

Australia

Queensland:  Tony Currie, Brad Backer, Gene Miles, Mal Meninga, Wayne Challis, Wally Lewis (c), Mark Murray, Rod Morris, Greg Conescu, Paul Khan, Rohan Hancock, Bryan Neibling, Norm Carr. Res - Cavill Heugh, Greg Holben. Coach - Arthur Beetson

New Zealand:  Gary Kemble, Gary Prohm, John Whittaker, James Leuluai, Dane O'Hara, Gordon Smith, Clayton Friend, Bruce Gall, Howie Tamati, Kevin Tamati, Graeme West (c), Tony Coll, Hugh McGahan. Res - Kevin Fisher, Peter Mellars

In the first game on the Australian leg of the tour, the Kiwis faced an almost test strength Queensland side, losing 31–16 at Lang Park.

First Test
The Australian's escaped with an 11-8 win over New Zealand at Lang Park in Brisbane. The forced retirement due to a chronic knee injury of Canterbury-Bankstown's George Peponis saw Manly-Warringah's Max Krilich named as both Australian hooker and new team captain.

English referee Fred Lindop had what the press termed a "Love affair with his whistle" and blew 44 penalties during the game. New Zealand led for most of the game through the boot of Gordon Smith, though with the number of penalties gave Michael Cronin ample opportunity to tie the game at 8-all late in the second half. Only a late John Muggleton try gave the Aussies their win.

Of Lindop's 44 penalties, New Zealand won the count 25-19. There were only 7 decisive scrums in the game with Lindop blowing a penalty to end most of them.

Second Test
Australia wrapped up the Trans-Tasman series 2-0 with a 20-2 win over the Kiwis at the Sydney Cricket Ground.

Although Ray Price was named as the Man of the Match, the game was a personal triumph for Australian halfback Steve Mortimer who controlled the play and led the Aussies to a 20-2 win.

Giant Queensland centre Mal Meninga, after not being used off the bench in the first test, made his official test debut in this game in place of Steve Rogers who moved to the bench. Meninga had an unhappy game though, dislocating his elbow in the 28th minute after a crunching blindside tackle from Kiwi winger Dane O'Hara, while at the same time attempting to break a tackle from Kiwi fullback Gary Kemble. The other major change for the Australians was Ray Price coming into the side at lock for the injured Paul Vautin.

Papua New Guinea

References

New Zealand national rugby league team tours
Rugby league tours of Australia
Rugby league tours of Papua New Guinea
New Zealand tour
New Zealand tour
Tour of Australia and Papua New Guinea